The List of shipwrecks in 1751 includes some ships sunk, wrecked or otherwise lost during 1751.

Until 1752, the year began on Lady Day (25 March) Thus 24 March 1750 was followed by 25 March 1751. 1751 was a special case, only having 282 days, per the Calendar (New Style) Act 1750, meaning that 31 December 1751 was followed by 1 January 1752.

March

26 March

April

20 April

Unknown date

May

Unknown date

June

25 June

27 June

Unknown date

July

24 July

Unknown date

August

8 August

30 August

Unknown date

September

8 September

11 September

14 September

18 September

Unknown date

October

2 October

30 October

Unknown date

November

13 November

16 November

17 November

22 November

24 November

28 November

Unknown date

December

2 December

13 December

24 December

31 December

Unknown date

References

1751